The 1990 Allan Cup was the Canadian senior ice hockey championship for the 1989–90 senior "AAA" season.  The event was hosted by the Montreal-Chomedy Construction in Vaudreuil, Quebec.  The 1990 tournament marked the 82nd time that the Allan Cup has been awarded.

Teams
Abbotsford Flyers (Western Canadian Champions)
Montreal-Chomedy Construction (Eastern Canadian Champions)

Best-of-Seven Series
Abbotsford Flyers 5 - Montreal-Chomedy Construction 3
Montreal-Chomedy Construction 10 - Abbotsford Flyers 6
Montreal-Chomedy Construction 5 - Abbotsford Flyers 3
Abbotsford Flyers 7 - Montreal-Chomedy Construction 2
Montreal-Chomedy Construction 7 - Abbotsford Flyers 0
Montreal-Chomedy Construction 3 - Abbotsford Flyers 1

External links
Allan Cup archives 
Allan Cup website

Allan Cup
Allan